The 1899 Marshall Thundering Herd football team represented Marshall University in the 1899 college football season. The team did not have a coach, and tied their lone game 0–0, marking the only time in school history that no points have been scored by Marshall or their opponents in an entire season.

The 1899 season marked the first undefeated season in Marshall school history, despite also being a winless season.

Schedule

Game summaries

at Catlettsburg

As it was the only game of the season, the Catlettsburg game was denoted as Marshall's homecoming despite being an away game. Due to the Spanish–American War, it is reported that the Marshall team may have been made up of both current and former Marshall players.

References

Marshall
Marshall Thundering Herd football seasons
College football undefeated seasons
College football winless seasons
Marshall Thundering Herd football